Lauterbrunnen is a railway station in the village and municipality of Lauterbrunnen in the Swiss canton of Bern. The station is on the Berner Oberland Bahn (BOB), whose trains operate services to Interlaken Ost. It is also the valley terminus of the Wengernalpbahn (WAB), whose trains operate to Kleine Scheidegg via Wengen, and of the Bergbahn Lauterbrunnen-Mürren (BLM), whose hybrid cable car and rail link runs to Mürren. Before 2006, this was a funicular (Seilbahn Lauterbrunnen–Grütschalp).

The BOB and WAB lines use different gauges, and there is no physical connection between them. However the trains operate from adjacent platforms within the same station. Trains of the BOB enter the station from the north, whilst trains of the WAB enter from the south. The lower, cable car, stage of the BLM departs from a terminal across the street from the main station which is connected to the main station via an underground walkway. The depot and workshop of the WAB lies to the south of the station.

Services 
 the following rail services stop at Lauterbrunnen:

 Regio:

Post bus services connect Lauterbrunnen station to other local places, including a half-hourly service to Stechelberg via the Trümmelbach Falls.

A large multi-story car park is situated to the east of station, intended for the use of travellers to the car free resorts of Wengen and Mürren, who must complete their journey by train.

References

External links 
 
 Lauterbrunnen station page on the Jungfraubahnen web site
 

Railway stations in the canton of Bern
Bernese Oberland Railway stations
Railway stations in Switzerland opened in 1890